Edith of England, also spelt Eadgyth or Ædgyth (910 – 946), a member of the House of Wessex, was a German queen from 936, by her marriage to King Otto I.

Life

Edith was born to the reigning English king Edward the Elder by his second wife, Ælfflæd, and hence was a granddaughter of King Alfred the Great. She had an older sister, Eadgifu.

At the request of the East Frankish king Henry the Fowler, who wished to stake a claim to equality and to seal the alliance between the two Saxon kingdoms, her half-brother King Æthelstan sent his sisters Edith and Edgiva to Germany. Henry's eldest son and heir to the throne Otto was instructed to choose whichever one pleased him best. Otto chose Edith, according to Hrotsvitha a woman "of pure noble countenance, graceful character and truly royal appearance", and married her in 930.

In 936 Henry the Fowler died and his eldest son Otto, Edith's husband, was crowned king at Aachen Cathedral. A surviving report of the ceremony by the medieval chronicler Widukind of Corvey makes no mention of his wife having been crowned at this point, but according to Bishop Thietmar of Merseburg's chronicle, Eadgyth was nevertheless anointed as queen, albeit in a separate ceremony.

As queen consort, Edith undertook the usual state duties of a "First Lady": when she turns up in the records it is generally in connection with gifts to the state's favoured monasteries or memorials to holy women and saints. In this respect she seems to have been more diligent than her now widowed and subsequently sainted mother-in-law, Queen Matilda, whose own charitable activities only achieve a single recorded mention from the period of Eadgyth's time as queen. There was probably rivalry between the Benedictine Monastery of St Maurice founded at Magdeburg by Otto and Eadgyth in 937, a year after coming to the throne, and Matilda's foundation Quedlinburg Abbey, intended by her as a memorial to her husband, the late King Henry. Edith accompanied her husband on his travels, though not during battles. While Otto fought against the rebellious dukes Eberhard of Franconia and Gilbert of Lorraine in 939, she spent the hostilities at Lorsch Abbey.

Like her brother, Æthelstan, Edith was devoted to the cult of their ancestor Saint Oswald of Northumbria and was instrumental in introducing this cult into Germany after her marriage to the emperor. Her lasting influence may have caused certain monasteries and churches in the Duchy of Saxony to be dedicated to this saint.

Eadgyth's death in 946 at a relatively young age, in her thirties, was unexpected. Otto apparently mourned the loss of a beloved spouse. He married Adelaide of Italy in 951.

Children
Edith and Otto's children were:
 Liudolf, Duke of Swabia (930 – 6 September 957)
 Liutgarde (931 – 18 November 953), married the Lotharingian duke Conrad the Red in 947
both buried in St. Alban's Abbey, Mainz.

Tomb

Initially buried in the St Maurice monastery, Edith's tomb since the 16th century has been located in Magdeburg Cathedral. Long regarded as a cenotaph, a lead coffin inside a stone sarcophagus with her name on it was found and opened in 2008 by archaeologists during work on the building. An inscription recorded that it was the body of Eadgyth, reburied in 1510. The fragmented and incomplete bones were examined in 2009, then brought to Bristol, England, for tests in 2010.

The investigations at Bristol, applying isotope tests on tooth enamel, checked whether she was born and brought up in Wessex and Mercia, as written history indicated. Testing on the bones revealed that they are the remains of Eadgyth, from study made of the enamel of the teeth in her upper jaw. Testing of the enamel revealed that the individual entombed at Magdeburg had spent time as a youth in the chalky uplands of Wessex. The bones are the oldest found of a member of English royalty.

Following the tests the bones were re-interred in a new titanium coffin in her tomb at Magdeburg Cathedral on 22 October 2010.

References

Sources
Freytag von Loringhoven, Baron. Stammtafeln zur Geschichte der Europäischen Staaten, 1965.
Klaniczay, Gábor. Holy Rulers and Blessed Princesses, 2002.

External links
How the study of teeth is revealing our history, Mike Pitts, The Guardian, 17 June 2010

|-
 
 

910 births
946 deaths
10th-century English people
10th-century English women
Anglo-Saxon women
Ottonian dynasty
German queens consort
10th-century German nobility
Burials at Magdeburg Cathedral
Duchesses of Saxony
House of Wessex
English princesses
Saxon princesses
10th-century German women
German people of English descent
Daughters of kings